Iffy may refer to:

Given name
 Iffy Onuora (born 1967),  association football coach and former professional footballer
 Iffy Allen (born 1994), English footballer

Other uses
 "Iffy" (song), by Chris Brown, 2022
 Immediately-invoked function expression, Javascript design pattern